Han Wang may refer to:
Wang Han (disambiguation) — a list of people with the surname Wang
Hanwang (disambiguation) – a list of places

Chinese royalty
Han Wang (Prince/King of Han) may refer to:

Warring States period
Monarchs of Han (state)
King Xuanhui of Han (died 312 BC)
King Xiang of Han (died 296 BC)
King Xi of Han (died 273 BC)
King Huanhui of Han (died 239 BC)
King An of Han (died 226 BC)

Eighteen Kingdoms & Chu–Han Contention
Emperor Gaozu of Han (256 BC – 195 BC), or Liu Bang, known as Prince/King of Han (漢王) from 206 BC to 202 BC
Han Cheng (died 206 BC), known as Prince/King of Han (韓王) in 206 BC
Zheng Chang, known as Prince/King of Han (韓王) from 206 BC to 205 BC
King Xin of Han (died 196 BC), known as Prince/King of Han (韓王) after 205 BC

Others
Jun of Gojoseon ( 220 BC – 194 BC), Gojoseon king who later fled to Mahan and proclaimed himself King/Prince of Han (韓王) some time after 194 BC
Yang Liang (died 605 or later), Sui dynasty prince, known as Prince of Han (漢王) after 581
Li Jiong (750–796), Tang dynasty prince, known as Prince of Han (韓王) after 762
Wang Jianli (871–940), general of the Five Dynasties period, known as Prince of Han (韓王) in 940 during the Later Jin
Emperor Zhenzong (968–1022), Song dynasty emperor, known as Prince of Han (韓王) from 983 to 988 before he became the emperor
Wanyan Yongji (died 1213), Jin dynasty emperor, known as Prince of Han (韓王) from 1191 to 1197 before he became the emperor
Chen Youliang (1320–1363), late-Yuan dynasty rebel who proclaimed himself King/Prince of Han (韓王) in 1359
Zhu Benli (1616–1664), Southern Ming emperor

See also
Han (disambiguation)
:Category:Han dynasty imperial princes